The Widow's Might is a lost 1918 American comedy silent film directed by William C. deMille and written by Marion Fairfax. The film stars Julian Eltinge, Florence Vidor, Gustav von Seyffertitz, Mayme Kelso, James Neill and Larry Steers. The film was released on January 28, 1918, by Paramount Pictures.

Plot

Cast
Julian Eltinge as Dick Tavish
Florence Vidor as Irene Stuart
Gustav von Seyffertitz as Horace Hammer
Mayme Kelso as Mrs. Pomeroy
James Neill as Red
Larry Steers as Pete
George Mackenzie as Cob
William Elmer

References

External links 
 

1918 films
1910s English-language films
Silent American comedy films
1918 comedy films
Paramount Pictures films
Films directed by William C. deMille
American black-and-white films
Lost American films
American silent feature films
1918 lost films
Lost comedy films
1910s American films